Point Pass was a station on the Robertstown railway line serving the  South Australian Mid North town of Point Pass.

History
Point Pass railway station opened on 9 December 1914 after a railway line to Robertstown was built from Eudunda on the Morgan railway line, going through Point Pass on the way.  Point Pass served both passengers and freight. The station closed as regular passenger services ceased on 23 September 1962. The station was demolished soon after, but the station sign was left at the site.  With traffic on the line dwindling, the last passenger train to pass the station was run by Train Tour Promotions using locomotive 804 to farewell the line on 20 May 1989. Less than a year later, the final train to pass the station, a grain train departed Robertstown on 21 February 1990. AN formally closed the line on 25 February 1990.

Present Day
No remains are left at the station site, having been demolished after the cessation of passenger services and the station sign being removed in later years.

References

Disused railway stations in South Australia
Railway stations in Australia opened in 1914
Railway stations closed in 1962
Mid North (South Australia)